The 2020 Texas Senate elections took place as part of the biennial United States elections. Texas voters elected state senators in 16 of the 31 state senate districts. State senators serve four-year terms in the Texas State Senate. Those elected in 2020 will only be elected for two years, however, as part of the 2-4-4 term system. A statewide map of Texas's state Senate districts can be obtained from the Texas Legislative Council.  and individual district maps can be obtained from the U.S. Census.

Following the 2016 state senate elections, Republicans maintained effective control of the Senate with 19 members.

To claim control of the chamber from Republicans, the Democrats would have needed to net four Senate seats. The Democratic Party gained one seat (District 19), leaving the Republicans with an 18 to 13 majority in the chamber. This election marks the first time since 1994 that the Democrats fielded candidates in more State Senate districts than the Republicans.

Retirements
One incumbent did not run for re-election in 2020:

Democrats
District 29: José R. Rodríguez: Retiring

Incumbents defeated

In the general election

Republicans
District 19: Pete Flores lost to Roland Gutierrez.

Predictions

Results summary

Close races

Summary of results by State Senate District

Detailed results by State Senate District

District 1

Republican primary

Democratic primary

General election

District 4

Republican primary

Democratic primary

General election

District 6

Democratic primary

General election

District 11

Republican primary

Democratic primary

General election

District 12

Republican primary

Democratic primary

General election

District 13

Democratic primary

Republican primary

General election

District 18

Republican primary

Democratic primary

General election

District 19

Republican primary

Democratic primary

Democratic primary runoff

General election

District 20

Democratic primary

Republican primary

General election

District 21

Democratic primary

Republican primary

General election

District 22

Republican primary

Democratic primary

General election

District 24

Republican primary

Democratic primary

General election

District 26

Democratic primary

General election

District 27

Democratic primary

Democratic primary runoff

Republican primary

General election

District 28

Republican primary

General election

District 29

Democratic primary

Republican primary

General election

Special elections

District 14
The seat for District 14 became vacant on April 30, 2020, after the resignation of Kirk Watson. A special election was originally called for July 14, 2020. However, Eddie Rodriguez chose not to contest the resulting runoff, thus the scheduled runoff was canceled and Sarah Eckhardt was deemed elected.

District 30
A special election for Texas State Senate District 30 has been called for September 29, 2020. The candidate filing deadline was August 28, 2020. The seat became vacant after the resignation of Pat Fallon on August 23, 2020.

Runoff

See also
 2020 Texas elections

References

External links
Elections Division at the Texas Secretary of State official website
Texas Election Results

 
  (State affiliate of the U.S. League of Women Voters)
 

Senate
Texas Senate
Texas State Senate elections